Balmiki Education Foundation is the higher secondary school based in Birtamod-1, Jhapa, Nepal. Balmiki Edu Foundation was established in 2003. It is located in the outskirts of Birtamod city.

References

External links

Secondary schools in Nepal
2003 establishments in Nepal
Educational institutions established in 2003